Concordia College (CC) is an ELC-12 independent, co-educational Lutheran school located in Highgate, Adelaide, South Australia. Established in 1890, the College is a school of the Lutheran Church of Australia and has been an International Baccalaureate (IB) World School since January 2001, offering the IB Primary Years, Middle Years and Diploma Programmes.

History 

Concordia College was founded by W. F. Peters, a Lutheran pastor in the Victorian country township of Murtoa. Peters purchased a private school founded in 1887 by T. W. Boehm, and re-established it in 1890 as a boys' college and training ground for future pastors and teachers. Lutheran leaders in South Australia moved the College to its present Highgate site in 1905. With the involvement of Pastor P. B. Zweck, Concordia became a Christian co-educational secondary college in 1927, operating under the South Australian District Synod of the Lutheran Church of Australia. Today, the College accepts all students whose parents are prepared to support the educational program and Christian ethos.

In 2016, Concordia College amalgamated with the neighbouring St John's Lutheran Primary School to form the new ELC to Year 12 Concordia College. Former principal Lester Saegenschnitter contributed to this amalgamation. Continued leadership restructuring occurred throughout 2021 and 2022, which led to the creation of a new role, "Head of College", that holds responsibility across the entirety of the college. The Head of College is supported by two principals: Principal - Primary School (St John's Campus) and Principal - Middle and Senior School (Concordia Campus).

Over the last two years, there has been other construction activity. Some old buildings are being demolished and new buildings are being constructed in their place.

Campus 

Concordia is located on two adjacent campuses in suburban Highgate, south of the Adelaide CBD. The St John's Campus students remain in the Early Learning Centre to Year 6 while the Concordia Campus is for students in Years 7 to 12.

The Concordia Campus includes:
The Chapel: The Chapel features a waterfall and fountain visible through a glass wall behind the altar, and a cross with a crown of thorns. The facility doubles as an assembly hall and a performance venue.
The Suaviter: Named from the school motto, the Suaviter is one of the original school buildings, and was formerly the Chapel. Retaining its stained glass windows, it has been converted into a conference and exhibition/display centre with catering facilities, where students participating in the hospitality curriculum receive training.
The Yangadlitya Resource Centre was opened on 29 May 2006 by Ningali Cullen, one of the first female indigenous Concordia College students (class of 1954). The College was given permission to use the name "Yangadlitya" (meaning "for the future") by the elders of the Kaurna people, who are the traditional custodians of the land on which Concordia stands.
Murtoa: Named after the town Murtoa, Victoria, the original location of the school, and built in 2010, this building includes a television studio and media-editing suite as well as several multipurpose classrooms. The music centre has been expanded into the building featuring new practice rooms. Built by Sarah Constructions, it features a design similar to the Yangadlitya building, including a skybridge connecting the two.
 The Hamann Wing: The original building of Malvern College purchased by Concordia for the relocation to Adelaide. Later renamed after former headmaster Professor H.P.A. Hamann, it is a heritage listed building.
The Tech Centre: Facilities for woodworking, metalworking, plastics and electronics.
The Gymnasium: A large gym area (used for basketball, netball, volleyball, etc.) with a weights room, classroom, changing rooms, administrative facilities, and foyer.
The Atrium (formerly Maths Centre): Senior classrooms.
The Nautilus Centre: Opened by Hieu Van Le AC, 35th Governor of South Australia in 2017, the science building includes laboratories, classrooms and associated offices. It has a swinging pendulum which was purchased by the Ajaero family.
The Peter Schmidt Music Centre: Practice rooms, a computer room and an ensemble room. Named after former Head of Music, Peter Schmidt
The Drama Centre: Originally the school gym, it is now a performance area with lights, sound and video facilities.
The Canteen: An externally managed business from which students can purchase food and drink.

Curriculum

Middle school

The Middle School Curriculum in Years 7 - 10 incorporates the International Baccalaureate Middle Years Programme (IBMYP). Students in years 7 and 8 undertake a common course, except in 'Language B', where they choose from German or Chinese. An after-hours Special Interest Music Program is available to selected students in Year 8. Students in Years 9 and 10 are able to make subject choices in The Arts and Technology learning areas.

Senior School

In Years 11 & 12, students are taught per the curriculum of the South Australian Certificate of Education (SACE). The IB Diploma Programme was offered as an alternative until 2022 when it was terminated due to lack of interest.

Co-curriculum
Co-curricular programs and activities offered include national subject competitions, career counselling and work experience, excursions, field camps and instrumental music tuition. Other extra-curricular programs include Middle School, Year 9 & Senior School choirs, the annual College musical, Big Bands, School Orchestra, Concert Band, Music Ensembles (Concert Vocal, String, Percussion), Chapel music, Chess Club, Debating, Duke of Edinburgh's Award, Pedal Prix, Snow Trip, Writers' Club, Mind and Body Club, Electronics Club and House competitions.

Student leadership 
Students from any year level may participate in Forum (a Student Representative Council) and students in Year 12 may become a House Captain, Student Leader, Deputy School Captain or School Captain. Students may also volunteer for respective leadership roles in their year level, such as, Year 10 Ambassador, Peer Support Leader or Year 12 Action Leader.

Musicals 
Concordia students may participate in the annual College musical. The musicals were performed at the Scott Theatre until 2009, then moved to the Hopgood Theatre for the musical Grease. The Sound of Music in April 2014 was the first Concordia musical to be held in the College Chapel. While Godspell was also held in the Chapel, the 2016 performance of Hairspray was once again in the Hopgood Theatre. The performances are generally held in March or April. A long-established tradition, these musicals are a showcase of the music and drama departments. In 2020, all performances of the College Musical were cancelled due to the COVID-19 pandemic, but a performance in the College Chapel without an audience was filmed. Musicals presented have included:

Others in previous years have included: L'il Abner, Carousel, My Fair Lady, Annie Get Your Gun, The Boy Friend, Fiddler on the Roof, The Pirates of Penzance, Calamity Jane, Viva Mexico, Ruddigore, HMS Pinafore, Can You Imagine, Free As Air, A Penny For a Song, God So Loved, Where Is God, Anything Goes, Tom Sawyer, Salad Days, and Trial By Jury.

Sport
Concordia College is a member of the Sports Association for Adelaide Schools (SAAS), and the Independent Girls Schools Sports Association (IGSSA). The sports offered at the College include: basketball, cricket, cross country, football, hockey, netball, soccer, softball, swimming, tennis and volleyball. Students also have the opportunity to participate in:
 Knockout Competitions – the College enters teams in statewide competitions in sports such as basketball, netball and volleyball.
 Sports Day – a whole school athletics event, held annually in March at the Santos Stadium with a focus on participation.
 Interschool Athletics SSSSA – (combined boys/girls) in Term 1; Achilles Cup (Boys) and IGSSA (Girls) competition in Term 3.
 Swimming Carnival – a school event for Years 7 – 10, held in the last week of the school year at Unley Swimming Centre.
 Interschool Swimming Carnivals – organised by SSSSA (combined boys/girls) and IGSSA (girls only)
 House Sport – Lunchtime netball, volleyball, and chess for which students may earn house points 
 Interschool Chess – the College participates in inter-school chess through the South Australian Junior Chess League

IGSSA premierships 
Concordia College has won the following IGSSA premierships.

 Football - 2019
 Volleyball (6) - 2012, 2013, 2015, 2018, 2019, 2020

House system 
As with most Australian schools, Concordia College utilises a house system. There are currently four houses, three named after three of the streets surrounding the College and the fourth, Malvern after the neighbouring suburb.

Students represent their house in a number of activities, including Sports Day, Swimming Carnival and lunchtime house sports. Students earn points for their house through participation in these activities, and the house with the most points at the conclusion of the school year is awarded the House Shield.

Alumni
 Ernest George Moll, Australian poet
 Vern Schuppan, Motor racing driver
 Ron Nagorcka, Contemporary composer, didjeridu and keyboard player
 Errol Wayne Noack, First Australian National Service conscript to be killed in the Vietnam War
 John Noack, Australian rules footballer for Sturt and Geelong
 Jay Schulz, Full Forward for Port Adelaide and Richmond
 James Aish, Midfielder for Fremantle Football Club
 Cameron Bayly, Cyclist for OCBC Singapore Cycling Team and Search2Retain Cycling Team
 Kayla Itsines, Personal trainer, entrepreneur, and author
 Connor Fearon, Cyclist for Kona Gravity / Enduro Team
 Odette England, Contemporary artist and photographer
 Mason Redman, Australian rules footballer for Glenelg and Essendon
 Amy Clark, Journalist/Podcast host
 Ryan Harrison, Labor Candidate for Unley in the 2022 South Australian state election
 Tom Johnson, 7News Tasmania Journalist
 Oscar Zi8gzag, professional Geoguessr

 Iswinder Singh, Sikh Preacher

Associated people
 Agnes Marie Johanna Dorsch, teacher
 Carl Friedrich Graebner, headmaster 1905-1939

See also 
List of schools in South Australia
List of Lutheran schools in Australia

References

Further reading 
 Leske, E. 1990. Concordia 100 years, Murtoa-Adelaide: a history of Concordia College, Adelaide. Concordia College, Highgate, South Australia. .

External links 
 

Lutheran schools in Australia
Private primary schools in Adelaide
Private secondary schools in South Australia
International Baccalaureate schools in Australia
Educational institutions established in 1890
1890 establishments in Australia
High schools and secondary schools affiliated with the Lutheran Church
Elementary and primary schools affiliated with the Lutheran Church